Wyglądacze  is a village in the administrative district of Gmina Sokolniki, within Wieruszów County, Łódź Voivodeship, in central Poland.

The village has a population of 32.

References

Villages in Wieruszów County